Saratov is a major city in southern Russia.

Saratov may also refer to:

Saratov Oblast, a federal subject of Russia
Saratov Hydroelectric Station, a hydroelectric power plant on the Volga River, Russia
Saratov Reservoir, an artificial lake in the lower part of the Volga River, Russia
Saratov Airlines, a Russian airline headquartered in Saratov, Russia
The Saratov Approach, a film about the kidnapping of two Mormon missionaries in this area of Russia
Saratov, a Russian Alligator-class landing ship which was sunk on 24 March during the 2022 Russian invasion of Ukraine

See also

Saratov Bridge, a bridge across the Volga River in the city of Saratov
Saratov South, a former air base in Russia
Saratov West, a former air base in Russia

Saratovsky (disambiguation)